Kumar Bandi is a town located in Kupwara, Muzaffarabad District, Pakistan. It is located at 34°16'15" North, 73°33'25" East at an altitude of 1434 metres."Sangir Syedan" about 17 km away from the Capital Muzaffar abad, Azad Jammu & Kashmir, is the highest residential point from the sea level of this village. The town was electrified in 1986.
.

Populated places in Muzaffarabad District